Francisco Lacerda Junior Airport  is the airport serving Cornélio Procópio, Brazil.
 
It is operated by the Municipality of Cornélio Procópio under the supervision of Aeroportos do Paraná (SEIL).

Airlines and destinations
No scheduled flights operate at this airport.

Access

See also

List of airports in Brazil

References

External links

Airports in Paraná (state)
Cornélio Procópio